Frederick Newland (14 January 1850 – 10 August 1921) was an English cricketer.  Newland was a right-handed batsman who bowled right-arm roundarm fast.  He was born at Henfield, Sussex.

Newland made his first-class debut for Sussex against Kent in 1875.  He made two further first-class appearances for Sussex, one further match in 1875 against Gloucestershire, and one in 1879 against the Marylebone Cricket Club.  In his three first-class matches, he scored a total of 11 runs at an average of 3.66, with a high score of 7 not out.  With the ball, he took 2 wickets at a bowling average of 39.50, with best figures of 2/46.

He died at Kingston by Sea, Sussex, on 10 August 1921.

References

External links
Frederick Newland at ESPNcricinfo
Frederick Newland at CricketArchive

1850 births
1921 deaths
People from Henfield
English cricketers
Sussex cricketers